Coleophora hieratica is a moth of the family Coleophoridae.

References

hieratica
Moths described in 1994